The Cost of a Kiss is a 1917 British silent drama film directed by Adrian Brunel and starring Bertram Wallis, Marjorie Day and Edward Cooper. It marked the feature film debut of Brunel who went on to become a leading British director of the 1920s. It was the only film produced by Mirror Films, a company set up by Brunel and the screenwriter H. Fowler Mear.

Cast
 Gordon Begg
 A.V. Bramble
 Edward Cooper
 Ethel Griffies
 Bertram Wallis as Lord Darlington

Bibliography
 Murphy, Robert & Brown, Geoff & Burton, Alan. Directors in British and Irish cinema: A Reference Companion. BFI, 2006.

External links

1917 films
1917 drama films
British drama films
Films directed by Adrian Brunel
British silent feature films
Films set in Madrid
British black-and-white films
1910s English-language films
1910s British films
Silent drama films